The Sardinian dhole (Cynotherium sardous) is an extinct insular canid which was endemic to what is now the Mediterranean islands of Sardinia (Italy) and Corsica (France), which were joined for much of the Pleistocene. It went extinct when humans began to settle on the island.

The oldest fossils of the Cynotherium lineage on Sardinia, belonging to the species Cynotherium malatestai (likely ancestral to C. sardous) date to the Early-Middle Pleistocene transition, corresponding to faunal turnover between the older Nesogoral Faunal Complex and the younger Microtus (Tyrrhenicola) faunal complex. The genomic analysis of a 21,000 year-old Sardinian dhole specimen indicates that the Sardinian dhole lineage and the Asian dhole lineage diverged from each other 885,000 years ago. Gene flow continued between the two lineages until between 500,000 and 300,000 years ago. The analysis showed low genomic diversity which may have led to the extinction of this dhole.

When the ancestor of this canid became confined to the island, its diet became limited to small and fast prey, such as rodents and rabbits.  This lack of large prey caused the Sardinian dhole to evolve into a small sized (perhaps ) canid. This view of Cynotherium as a predator specializing in small, fast prey is supported by an examination of the animal's anatomy. The evolution of short, powerful limbs, a low neck carriage and increased head and neck mobility suggests an animal well suited for stalking and then quickly pouncing on or running down small prey.

See also
 List of extinct animals of Europe
 Insular dwarfism
 Corsican red deer

References

External links
ISPRA Photo of Cynotherium sardous

Canina (subtribe)
Prehistoric mammals of Europe
Fauna of Corsica
Fauna of Sardinia
Extinct mammals of Europe
Pleistocene carnivorans
Pleistocene extinctions
Extinct canines
Fossil taxa described in 1857
Mammals described in 1857